Year 1009 (MIX) was a common year starting on Saturday of the Julian calendar.

Events 
 By place 

 Europe 
 February 14 or March 9 – The first known mention is made of the name of Lithuania, in connection with the murder of Bruno of Querfurt. He is beheaded and his 18 companions are hanged the same day during a mission among the Prussians in the Baltic region.
 May 9 – Lombard Revolt: Lombard forces led by Melus, an Italian nobleman, revolt in Bari against the Catepanate of Italy (a province of the Byzantine Empire). He and his brother-in-law Dattus (or Datto) mobilise a large army and invade southern Italy.
 November 1 – Berber forces led by Sulayman ibn al-Hakam defeat the Umayyad caliph Muhammad II in the battle of Alcolea. He enters the city of Córdoba, which is sacked by Berbers and Castillans. Sulayman is elected as caliph of the Caliphate of Córdoba.
 Doge Pietro II Orseolo dies after an 18-year reign in which he has started the expansion of Venetia by conquering the islands of Lastovo and Korčula along the Dalmatian coast. Pietro is succeeded by his 16-year-old son Otto Orseolo as sole ruler of Venice.
 Law on planning and building passed in Serbia during the reign of Prince Jovan Vladimir.

 England 
 Danish Viking raiders led by Sweyn Forkbeard repeatedly attack southern England, destroying the land to avenge the St. Brice's Day massacre of 1002.
August - A large Viking army led by Thorkell the Tall lands on Kent and proceeds to terrorize most of Southern England.The Anglo-Saxon Chronicle

 Asia 
 Spring – General Gang Jo leads a coup against King Mokjong. He is deposed and sent into exile in Chungju. After murdering Mokjong, Gang Jo places Hyeonjong on the throne as ruler of Goryeo.
 November – The Lý Dynasty in Vietnam is proclaimed by Emperor Lý Thái Tổ (former commander of the palace guard) after the death of Lê Long Đĩnh, the last monarch of the Lê Dynasty.

 Japan 
 Princess Takahime (daughter of Imperial Prince Tomohira, cousin of emperor Ichijo) is married to Fujiwara no Yorimichi, first son of Fujiwara no Michinaga, enlarging the latter’s power.
 Takashina no Mitsuko is imprisoned for cursing the empress; Fujiwara no Korechika is also implicated but later pardoned.
 Murasaki Shikibu teaches the Chinese written language to Empress Shoshi in secret because this is usually a male accomplishment.

 By topic 

 Religion 
 Summer – Pope John XVIII dies after a pontificate of 5-years. He is succeeded by Sergius IV as the 142nd pope of the Catholic Church.
 August 29 – Mainz Cathedral suffers extensive damage from a fire, which destroys the building on the day of its inauguration.
 October 18 – The Church of the Holy Sepulchre in Jerusalem is destroyed by the Fatimid caliph Al-Hakim bi-Amr Allah.

Births 
 May 22 – Su Xun, Chinese writer (d. 1066)
 December 14 – Atsunaga, future Emperor Go-Suzaku of Japan (d. 1045)
 Adèle of France, countess of Flanders (d. 1079)
 Ali Hariri, Marwanid poet and philosopher (d. 1079)
 George the Hagiorite, Georgian calligrapher (d. 1065) 
 Qatran Tabrizi, Persian poet and writer (d. 1072)
 Toirdelbach Ua Briain, king of Munster (d. 1086)
 Yusuf ibn Tashfin, sultan of Morocco (d. 1106)

Deaths 
 February 14 – Bruno of Querfurt, German missionary bishop
 March 2 – Mokjong, king of Goryeo (Korea) (b. 980)
 March 3 – Abd al-Rahman Sanchuelo, Umayyad chief minister (b. 983)
 June or July – John XVIII, pope of the Catholic Church
 August 21 – Tomohira, Japanese imperial prince (uncle of the emperor)
 November 13 – Dedo I, German nobleman (b. 950)
 December 25 – Bernard William, French nobleman
 Abu al-Hasan Ali, Ma'munid ruler of Khwarezm (Iran)
 Abu Muhammad Lu'lu' al-Kabir, emir of Aleppo (Syria)
 Fujiwara no Nagatō, Japanese bureaucrat and poet (b. 949)
 Ibn Yunus, Fatimid astronomer and mathematician
 Khalaf ibn Ahmad, emir of the Saffarid Dynasty (b. 937)
 Lê Long Đĩnh, emperor of the Lê Dynasty (b. 986)
 Pietro II Orseolo, doge of Venice (b. 961)
 Xiao Yanyan, Chinese Khitan empress (b. 953)

References